1X Corp N.V. (also known as "1xBet") is an online gambling company licensed by Curaçao eGaming License. It was founded in 2007 and registered in Cyprus. In 2019, they experienced considerable growth, briefly sponsoring Chelsea FC and Liverpool FC before being ousted for their involvement in illegal activities.

Initially a Russian Casino, it expanded its online presence in 2014 by partnering with 'BookmakerPub'. It maintains operations in Malta, Cyprus and Abuja.

As of January 2023, 1xBet no longer appears to be located in Curaçao after being declared bankrupt, following a lawsuit against the company and its licensor. The website continues to operate online, and has since relocated to Nigeria.

Controversies 
Following an investigation by The Sunday Times in 2019, 1xBet's license was rescinded by the UK Gambling Commission (UKGC) after revelations of involvement "promoting a "pornhub casino", bets on children's sports and advertising on illegal websites."

Despite legal issues in the United Kingdom, as of 2020, 1xBet continued to sponsor FC Barcelona, Seria A, and the Confederation of African Football (CAF), among various other sports.

1xBet features on Russia's payment processor and Federal Tax Service blacklist.

Criminal investigation 
In early 2020, awareness was raised of an unlawful practice. 

Later in August 2020, the Directorate of the Investigative Committee for the Russian Bryansk Region released the names of the supposed creators of 1xBet. These are "Sergey Karshkov", "Roman Semiokhin" and "Dmitry Kazorin".

The trio are suspected of organizing the online bookmaker 1xBet, and are defendants in a criminal case, with penalty of imprisonment. A number of estates in Russia with a total value of 1.5 billion rubles were seized. The Investigative Committee of Russia has put them on the international wanted list. All three have Cypriot citizenship.

In 2021, Parlan Law Firm announced a search for victims of 1Xbet in Russia. The company has organized a service for filing applications to the investigative committee. They filed a lawsuit against the owner of the Russian version of 1Xbet - bookmaker 1XStavka.

Bankruptcy 
In November 2021 1xBet's subsidiary company, 1хCorр MV, filed for bankruptcy in a Curaçao court after it refused to refund a group of gamblers represented by the foundation for curaçao gaming victims. The company was declared bankrupt in June 2022 but continued to operate.

The individuals state that 1xBet structurally deniеs the legitimate wins of players with millions of euros in unpaid winnings.

In January 2023, 1xBet was declared bankrupt by the Dutch Supreme Court in the Netherlands.

Despite this, the group continues to operate under different brands and holding companies, and maintains sponsorship deals with Paris Saint-Germain F.C., F.C Barcelona, and various African nations, where betting is either unregulated or poorly enforced.

Sponsors 
In July 2019, FC Barcelona announced they had signed a partnership with 1xBet to name the company as the team’s new global partner. The partnership will see the organizations working together in different activities with the partnership running until 30 June 2024.

In May 2022, 1xBet signed an agreement to become the title partner of esports organisation Team Spirit.

During May 2022, esports organization OG Esports announced that the company had signed a sponsorship deal with 1xBet. The agreement names 1xBet as OG’s official betting sponsor, with the company logo to appear on Dota 2 roster jerseys.

On 1 August 2022, Paris Saint-Germain announced 1xBet as their new regional partner in Africa and Asia.

In August 2022, E-sports gaming organization Tundra Esports announced a three-year contract naming 1xBet as Tundra’s official betting sponsor, with the company logo to appear on Dota 2 roster jerseys and events to take place on the 1xBet website.

In September 2022, 1xBet were announced as the 'Official Regional Partner' of French football club LOSC Lille. The agreement grants 1xBet promotional rights to use the club's logos and player images, in addition to match advertising.

During February 2023, The Professional Fighters League (PFL) announced a new sponsorship deal with 1xBet. The deal names 1xBet as the official sportsbook for the PFL in Latin America and Saharan Africa.

Alleged owners 
Karshkov, an ex-police major and head of the "K" department of the Internal Affairs Directorate for the Bryansk region - was granted Cypriot citizenship in 2020 by obtaining a "Golden Passport" through substantial investments in the country. Alongside Russian billionaire Semiokhin and Kazorin, all three have fled to Cyprus to avoid Russian prosecution.

References

External links
 

Russian companies established in 2007
Online casinos
Bookmakers